The Greenlaw House in Franklinton in Washington Parish, Louisiana was built in 1906.  It was listed on the National Register of Historic Places in 1998.
 
It is a one-and-a-half-story Queen Anne-style house with characteristic massing and textures.  It has a turret and a wraparound gallery with bracketed Eastlake-style columns.

Edward Runnels Greenlaw, a businessman in sawmills and railroads, had the house built for his parents, Civil War veteran Captain Lawrence Dade Greenlaw and Dora Runnels Greenlaw, a poet.

The Greenlaw House has been rumored to be haunted which is a shared belief amongst a few previous residents.

References

Houses on the National Register of Historic Places in Louisiana
Queen Anne architecture in Louisiana
Houses completed in 1906
Washington Parish, Louisiana
1906 establishments in Louisiana